Stenocereus fimbriatus is a species of cactus.

Description
Stenocereus fimbriatus is endemic to the West Indies.

Range
Jamaica, Cuba, Hispaniola, Puerto Rico (Caja de Muertos, Culebra, Desecheo, Magueyes, Mona), St. John

Habitat

Ecology

Etymology

Taxonomy

References

fimbriatus